The Werribee Bears Rugby League Club is a rugby league team based in Werribee, Victoria, Australia.

The Werribee Bears play in the Victorian Rugby League competition.  They have teams entered in both the Senior and Junior Competition in the VRL. They also have a Senior Women's and Junior Girls Rugby League OzTag team.

Club history

The Werribee Bears Rugby League Club was first established in 2008 by Rangi Tiananga.  Rangi had an idea that he wanted to start a rugby league club in Werribee as he saw the need of a different code to be started in the Wyndham District area, as it was dominated by AFL/VFL footy clubs, Soccer clubs and one Rugby club. but there were no Rugby League club in the area.

With the help of his son Aaron Tiananga, the idea was put into reality.  News of a new rugby league club being established in the Werribee area spread fast.  There was a lot of interest from people in the community that wanted to be involved with the club.  The first step was to come up with a name.  The name Werribee Bears was chosen because a Bear represents Strength which represents the strength as an individual, as a team and as a club.

In May 2008 the club approached the Victorian Rugby League Association (VRL) to be affiliated with as they ran the Victorian Rugby League Competition.  The club first entered the 2009 season as it was too late to enter the team in the 2008 season because it had already started.

In June 2008 the club was now Incorporated with the Victorian Consumers Affairs under the name "Werribee Bears Rugby League Sports Club Inc".  The club was also registered with an Australian Business Number (ABN) and Tax file number.

In July 2008 a large number of players showed their interest in playing for the Werribee Bears senior side. The first training session was held on 8 July and over 30 players turned up every Sunday for training. Due to this the Victorian Rugby League (VRL) gave the club four exhibition matches to play during the 2008 season which was a great way to introduce the Werribee Bears into the VRL and to give the players a taste for what was to come in the 2009 season.

The main goal of the Werribee Bears is first and foremost to make it a family orientated club and to have its doors open to anyone who wishes to be a member, supporter or volunteer with Werribee Bears Rugby League Club.

The Club motto is "Commitment, Respect & Dedication"

Premierships 
 

 2009 - Werribee Bears Senior Men won the VRL 2nd Division Grand Final beating the Altona Roosters 24–20.
 2010 - Werribee Bears Senior Women OzTag Rugby League Team won the VRL Women OzTag Grand Final beating the Altona Roosters 2-0
 2013 - Werribee Bears Senior Women Rugby League Tag Team won the VRL Women's Tag Grand Final beating Doveton Steelers (2nd Premiership)
 2014 - Werribee Bears Under 11's won the VRL U11's Grand Final beating Northern Thunder
 2014 - Werribee Bears Under 14's won the VRL U14's (Division 2) Grand Final beating Sunbury Tigers
 2014 - Werribee Bears Senior Women Rugby League Tag Team won the VRL Women's Tag Grand Final beating Doveton Steelers (3rd Premiership)
 2016 - Werribee Bears U11's won their Grand Final
 2016 - Werribee Bears A-grade winning their maiden first division Grand Final against Casey Warriors 14-10
 2016 - Werribee Bears Reserve Grade Men win their Grand Final
 2017 - Werribee Bears U12's Won their Grand Final against Casey Warriors
 2017 - Werribee Bears U14's Girl Tag Won their Grand Final against Northern Thunder
 2017 - Werribee Bears Senior Men win the First Division Grand Final
 2017 - Werribee Bears Reserve Grade Men win their Grand Final
2018 - Werribee Bears Reserve Grade Men win their Grand Final
2018 - Werribee Bears Senior Men win the First Division Grand Final
2018 - Werribee Bears Senior Women win the First Division Grand Final

Notable Juniors
Najvada George – St. George Illawarra Dragons Women / Parramatta Eels Women
Hailee-Jay Ormond-Maunsell – Gold Coast Titans Women

See also

Rugby league in Victoria

References

External links
 

Rugby league clubs in Melbourne
Rugby league teams in Victoria (Australia)
Rugby clubs established in 2008
2008 establishments in Australia
Sport in the City of Wyndham
Werribee, Victoria